Pavel Yevgenyevich Maslov (born 14 April 2000) is a Russian football player who plays for FC Spartak Moscow as a centre-back.

Club career
He made his debut in the Russian Football National League for FC Tyumen on 16 March 2016 in a game against FC Baikal Irkutsk.

On 13 June 2018, he signed with FC Spartak Moscow. He made his debut for the main squad of FC Spartak Moscow on 26 September 2018 in a Russian Cup game against FC Chernomorets Novorossiysk. He made his Russian Premier League debut on 14 March 2020 when he started the game against FC Orenburg.

Personal life
He is a son of Yevgeni Maslov.

Career statistics

References

External links
 
 
 Profile by Russian Football National League

2000 births
People from Tyumen
Sportspeople from Tyumen Oblast
Living people
Russian footballers
Russia youth international footballers
Russia under-21 international footballers
Association football defenders
FC Tyumen players
FC Spartak-2 Moscow players
FC Spartak Moscow players
Russian First League players
Russian Premier League players